Stratusfaction was a Canadian music variety television series which aired on CBC Television in mid-1973.

Premise
Stratusfaction was an 18-member Calgary music group which performed throughout western Canada since 1971. They starred in this mid-year replacement series to perform theatrical and pop songs. Guest artists were featured in each episode except the final: Ed Evanko, Dianne Heatherington, Catherine McKinnon, Pat Rose and Diane Stapley. The series was recorded in Winnipeg on location at the Manitoba Theatre Centre during June 1973.

Scheduling
This half-hour series was broadcast Saturdays at 7:00 p.m. from 28 July to 8 September 1973.

References

External links
 

CBC Television original programming
1973 Canadian television series debuts
1973 Canadian television series endings
1970s Canadian music television series